The Andamanese are the indigenous peoples of the Andaman Islands, part of India's Andaman and Nicobar Islands union territory in the southeastern part of the Bay of Bengal in Southeast Asia. The Andamanese peoples are among the various groups considered Negrito, owing to their dark skin and diminutive stature. All Andamanese traditionally lived a hunter-gatherer lifestyle, and appear to have lived in substantial isolation for thousands of years. It is suggested that the Andamanese settled in the Andaman Islands around the latest glacial maximum, around 26,000 years ago.

The Andamanese peoples included the Great Andamanese and Jarawas of the Great Andaman archipelago, the Jangil of Rutland Island, the Onge of Little Andaman, and the Sentinelese of North Sentinel Island. At the end of the 18th century, when they first came into sustained contact with outsiders, an estimated 7,000 Andamanese remained. In the next century, they experienced a massive population decline due to epidemics of outside diseases and loss of territory. Today, only roughly 400–450 Andamanese remain, with the Jangil being extinct. Only the Jarawa and the Sentinelese maintain a steadfast independence, refusing most attempts at contact by outsiders.

The Andamanese are a designated Scheduled Tribe in India's constitution.

History
Until the late 18th century, the Andamanese culture, language, and genetics were preserved from outside influences by their fierce reaction to visitors, which included killing any shipwrecked foreigners, and by the remoteness of the islands. The various tribes and their mutually unintelligible languages thus are believed to have evolved on their own over millennia.

Venetian explorer Marco Polo wrote of the Andamanese in 1294, in The Travels of Marco Polo:

Origins

According to Chaubey and Endicott (2013), the Andaman Islands were settled less than 26,000 years ago, by people who were not direct descendants of the first migrants out of Africa. According to Wang et al. (2011),

It was previously assumed that the Andaman ancestors were part of the initial Great Coastal Migration (South-Eurasians or Australasians) that was the first expansion of humanity out of Africa, via the Arabian peninsula, along the coastal regions of the South Asia towards Insular Southeast Asia, and Oceania. The Andamanese were considered to be a pristine example of a hypothesized Negrito population, which showed similar physical characteristics, and was supposed to have existed throughout southeast Asia. The existence of a specific Negrito-population is nowadays doubted. Their commonalities could be the result of evolutionary convergence and/or a shared history.

Colonial era

The Andamanese's protective isolation changed with the establishment of a British colonial presence on the islands. Lacking immunity against common infectious diseases of the Eurasian mainland, the large Jarawa habitats on the southeastern regions of South Andaman Island experienced a massive population decline due to disease within four years of the establishment of a colonial presence on the island in 1789. Epidemics of pneumonia, measles and influenza spread rapidly and exacted heavy tolls, as did alcoholism. In the 19th century, a measles epidemic killed 50% of the Andamanese population. By 1875, the Andamanese were already "perilously close to extinction". In 1888, the British government set in place a policy of "organized gift giving" that continued in varying forms until the islands, as part of the British Raj, gained independence from the British Empire.

Tensions between the colonial administration and the Andamanese increased due to British officials introducing alcohol and opium to the Andamanese. During mid-19th century, the British government in India established penal colonies on the islands and an increasing number of Indian and Karen arrived, both as settlers and prisoners.

In 1867, the British launched the Andaman Islands expedition in order to rescue shipwrecked sailors from the Assam Valley on the Andamanese islands. The expedition was attacked by the Onge people upon their approach to the islands and were forced to withdraw. Four Victoria crosses were awarded to members of the expedition.

In 1923, the British ornithologist and anthropologist Frank Finn, who visited the islands in the 1890s while working for the Indian Museum, described the Andamanese as "The World's Most Primitive People", writing:

In the 1940s, the Jarawa were attacked by imperial Japanese forces for their hostility. This Japanese attack was criticized as a war crime by many observers.

Recent history
In 1974, a film crew and anthropologist Triloknath Pandit attempted friendly contact by leaving a tethered pig, some pots and pans, some fruit, and toys on the beach at North Sentinel Island. One of the islanders shot the film director in the thigh with an arrow. The following year, European visitors were repulsed with arrows.

On 2 August 1981, the Hong Kong freighter ship Primrose grounded on the North Sentinel Island reef. A few days later, crewmen on the immobile vessel observed that small black men were carrying spears and arrows and building boats on the beach. The captain of the Primrose radioed for an urgent airdrop of firearms so the crew could defend themselves, but did not receive them. Heavy seas kept the islanders away from the ship. After a week, the crew were rescued by an Indian navy helicopter.

On 4 January 1991, Triloknath Pandit made the first known friendly contact with the Sentinelese.

Until 1996, the Jarawa met most visitors with flying arrows. From time to time, they attacked and killed poachers on the lands reserved to them by the Indian government. They also killed some workers building the Andaman Trunk Road (ATR), which traverses Jarawa lands. One of the earliest peaceful contacts with the Jarawa occurred in 1996. Settlers found a teenaged Jarawa boy named Enmei near Kadamtala town. The boy was immobilized with a broken foot. They took Enmei to a hospital, where he received good care. Over several weeks, Enmei learned a few words of Hindi before returning to his jungle home. The following year, Jarawa individuals and small groups began appearing along roadsides and occasionally venturing into settlements to steal food. The ATR may have interfered with traditional Jarawa food sources.

On 17 November 2018, a United States missionary, John Allen Chau, was killed when he tried to introduce Christianity to the Sentinelese tribe. The Sentinelese have been protected from contact with the outside world. Trips to the Island are prohibited by Indian law. Chau was brought near the island by local fishermen, who were later arrested during the investigation into his death. Indian authorities attempted to retrieve Chau's remains without success.

Tribes

The five major groups of Andamanese are:

 Great Andamanese, traditionally of the Great Andaman archipelago but now living on Strait Island. Their population was 52 as of 2010.
 Jarawa traditionally of the southern part of South Andaman Island in the Great Andaman archipelago but now living in the ex-Great Andamanese homeland in the West Coast and central parts of South and Middle Andaman Islands. Their population was 380 as of 2011.
 Jangil or Rutland Jarawa of Rutland Island, extinct by 1931
 Onge of Little Andaman, at 101 individuals as of 2011.
 Sentinelese of North Sentinel Island, estimated to be 100 to 200 individuals.

By the end of the eighteenth century, there were an estimated 5,000 Great Andamanese living on Great Andaman. Altogether they comprised ten distinct tribes with different languages. The population quickly dwindled to 600 in 1901 and to 19 by 1961. It has increased slowly after that, following their move to a reservation on Strait Island. As of 2010, the population was 52, representing a mix of the former tribes.

The Jarawa originally inhabited southeastern Jarawa Island and have migrated to the west coast of Great Andaman in the wake of the Great Andamanese. The Onge once lived throughout Little Andaman and now are confined to two reservations on the island. The Jangil, who originally inhabited Rutland Island, were extinct by 1931; the last individual was sighted in 1907. Only the Sentinelese are still living in their original homeland on North Sentinel Island, largely undisturbed, and have fiercely resisted all attempts at contact.

Languages 

The Andamanese languages are considered to be the fifth language family of India, following the Indo-European, Dravidian, Austroasiatic, and Sino-Tibetan.

While some connections have been tentatively proposed with other language families, such as Austronesian, or the controversial Indo-Pacific family, the consensus view is currently that Andamanese languages form a separate language family – or rather, two unrelated linguistic families: Greater Andamanese and Ongan.

Culture

Until contact, the Andamanese were strict hunter-gatherers. They did not practice cultivation, and lived off hunting indigenous pigs, fishing, and gathering. Their only weapons were the bow, adzes, and wooden harpoons. The Andamanese knew of no method for making fire in the nineteenth century. They instead carefully preserved embers in hollowed-out trees from fires caused by lightning strikes.

The men wore girdles made of hibiscus fiber which carried useful tools and weapons for when they went hunting. The women on the other hand wore a tribal dress containing leaves that were held by a belt. A majority of them had painted bodies as well. They usually slept on leaves or mats and had either permanent or temporary habitation among the tribes. All habitations were man made.

Some of the tribe members were credited to having supernatural powers. They were called oko-pai-ad, which meant dreamer. They were thought to have an influence on the members of the tribe and would bring misfortune to those who did not believe in their abilities. Traditional knowledge practitioners were the ones who helped with healthcare. The medicine that was used to cure illnesses were herbal most of the time. Various types of medicinal plants were used by the islanders. 77 total traditional knowledge practitioners were identified and 132 medicinal plants were used. The members of the tribes found various ways to use leaves in their everyday lives including clothing, medicine, and to sleep on.

Anthropologist A.R. Radcliffe Brown argued that the Andamanese had no government and made decisions by group consensus.

Religion 
The native Andamanese religion and belief system is a form of animism. Ancestor worship is an important element in the religious traditions of the Andaman islands. Andamanese Mythology held that humans emerged from split bamboo, whereas the women were fashioned from clay. One version found by Alfred Reginald Radcliffe-Brown held that the first man died and went to heaven, a pleasurable world, but this blissful period ended due to breaking a food taboo, specifically eating the forbidden vegetables in the Puluga's garden. Thus Catastrophe ensued, and eventually the people grew overpopulated and didn't follow Puluga's laws, and hence there was a Great Flood that left four survivors, who lost their fire.

Physical appearance

Phenotype 

Negritos, specifically Andamanese, are grouped together by phenotype and anthropological features. Three physical features that distinguish the Andaman islanders include: skin colour, hair, and stature. Those of the Andaman islands have dark skin, are short in stature, and have "frizzy" hair, while displaying "Asiatic facial features".

Dental morphology 
Dental characteristics also group the Andamanese between Negrito and East-Asian samples.

When comparing dental morphology the focus is on overall size and tooth shape. To measure the size and shape, Penrose's size and shape statistic is used. To calculate tooth size, the sum of the tooth area is taken. Factor analysis is applied to tooth size to achieve tooth shape. Results have shown that the dental morphology of Andaman Islanders resembles that of tribal populations of South Asia (Adivasi) the most, followed by Philippine Negrito groups, contemporary Southeast Asians, and East Asians. The tooth size of the Andamanese was found to be most similar to that of Han Chinese and Japanese.

Genetics

Genetic analysis, both of nuclear DNA and mitochondrial DNA provide information about the origins of the Andamanese. The Andamanese are most genetically similar to the Malaysian Negrito tribes, followed by contemporary East Asian people.

Genetic variation
The Andamanese show a very small genetic variation, which is indicative of populations that have experienced a population bottleneck and then developed in isolation for a long period.

An allele has been discovered among the Jarawas that is found nowhere else in the world. Blood samples of 116 Jarawas were collected and tested for Duffy blood group and malarial parasite infectivity. Results showed a total absence of both Fya and Fyb antigens in two areas (Kadamtala and R.K Nallah) and low prevalence of both Fya antigen in another two areas (Jirkatang and Tirur). There was an absence of malarial parasite Plasmodium vivax infection though Plasmodium falciparum infection was present in 27·59% of cases. A very high frequency of Fy (a–b–) in the Jarawa tribe from all the four jungle areas of Andaman Islands along with total absence of P. vivax infections suggests the selective advantage offered to Fy (a–b–) individuals against P. vivax infection.

External genetic affinity
Genetic studies have revealed that the Andamanese people are relatively closely related to the indigenous South Asian hunter-gatherers, often termed "Ancient Ancestral South Indians" (AASI). The Andamanese also show high affinity to other Australasian populations (AA), such as Melanesians, as well as to East/Southeast Asian peoples (ESEA). Phylogenetic data suggests that an early initial eastern lineage trifurcated, and gave rise to Australasians (Oceanians), the AASI and Andamanese, as well as East/Southeast Asians, although Oceanians (Papuans and Aboriginal Australians) may have also received some geneflow from an earlier group (xOoA), around 2%, next to additional archaic admixture in the Sahul region. While the Andamanese are often used as proxy for AASI ancestry, a study by Yelmen et al. (2019) argues that isolated South Indian tribal groups, such as the Paniya, Kharia, or Soliga people, would serve as a better proxy for AASI ancestry. Overall, the Malaysian Negritos (Semang), such as the Maniq people, Jahai people, and Batek people, are the closest modern living relatives of the Andamanese people.

When compared with ancient DNA samples, Andamanese peoples are closest to the pre-Neolithic Hoabinhians in Mainland Southeast Asia (covered by two samples from Malaysia and Laos).

Y-DNA

The male Y-chromosome in humans is inherited exclusively through paternal descent. All sampled males of Onges (23/23) and Jarawas (4/4) belong to a sublineage of D-M174(D1a3). However, male Great Andamanese do not appear to carry these clades. A low resolution study suggests that they belong to haplogroups K, L, O and P1 (P-M45).

A 2017 study by Mondal et al. finds that the Y-chromosome of the Riang people (a Tibeto-Burmese population), sublineage D1a3 (D-M174*) and the Andamanese D1a3 (*D-Y34637) have their nearest related lineages in East Asia, splitting about 23,000 years ago from an East Asian-related population. The Jarawa and Onge shared this D1a3 lineage with each other within the last ~7,000 years, suggesting a bottleneck event. They further suggest that: “This strongly suggests that haplogroup D does not indicate a separate ancestry for Andamanese populations. Rather, haplogroup D was part of the standing variation carried by the OOA expansion, and later lost from most of the populations except in Andaman and partially in Japan and Tibet”. Other haplogroups found among Andamanese include haplogroup P, and L-M20.

Several studies (Hammer et al. 2006, Shinoda 2008, Matsumoto 2009, Cabrera et al. 2018) suggest that the paternal haplogroup D-M174 originated somewhere in Central Asia. According to Hammer et al., haplogroup D-M174 originated between Tibet and the Altai mountains. He suggests that there were multiple waves into Eastern Eurasia. In a 2019 study by Haber et al. showed that Haplogroup D-M174 originated in Central Asia and evolved as it migrated to different directions of the continent. One group of population migrated to Siberia, others to Japan and Tibet, and another group migrated to the Andaman islands.

mt-DNA
Bulbeck (2013) shows the Andamanese maternal mtDNA is entirely mitochondrial Haplogroup M. Haplogroup M (mtDNA) is a descendant of haplogroup L3, typically found in Eurasia and parts of Africa. The mtDNA M is found in all Onge and is also the predominant lineages of Negrito Semang tribes from Thailand and Malaysia, as well as of other East Asian people. Analysis of mtDNA, which is inherited exclusively by maternal descent, confirms the above results. Haplogroup M is however also the single most common mtDNA haplogroup in Asia, where it represents 60% of all maternal lineages. Haplogroup M is also relatively common in Northeast Africa of Somalis, Oromo over 20%. Also in the Tuareg in Mali and Burkina Faso at 18.42%.

Archaic Admixture
Unlike some Negrito populations of Southeast Asia, Andaman Islanders have not been found to have Denisovan ancestry. However, they are estimated, like all other non-African populations, to possess approximately 1-2% Neanderthal ancestry. A study suggests that all Asian and Australo-Papuan populations, including Andaman Islanders, also share between 2.6 and 3.4% of the genetic profile of a previously unknown hominin that was genetically roughly equidistant to Denisovans and Neanderthals. However, a 2018 study by Skoglund et al. led by the Harvard Reich lab team did not replicate that result and did not find evidence for admixture from an unknown hominin in the Andamanese or other Asians. Wall et al. 2019 did not find evidence of archaic admixture in Andamanese.

See also 
Adivasis
Battle of Aberdeen (Andaman Islands)
Andaman Tamils
Andamanese languages
Uncontacted peoples
Early human migrations
Nicobarese people

Notes

References

External links 
The Andamanese by George Weber
News by Survival International
Videos by Survival International

Ethnic groups in the Andaman and Nicobar Islands
Indigenous peoples of South Asia
Scheduled Tribes of the Andaman and Nicobar Islands
Negritos